Er-xuan Gao, better known by his stage name OSN, is a Taiwanese rapper and singer. Gao's music is characterized by his sentimental hip hop style and use of both Mandarin and English lyrics. Gao is represented by SKR Presents, a record label by music producer .

Early life 
Gao was born in Muzha, Taipei City. His father is a professor at Xiamen University, and his mother is a junior high school teacher. He briefly attended a community college in the United States, but returned to Taiwan in a year and a half.

Career 
After serving his four-month mandatory military service, Gao met Skot Suyama, who helped produce his future songs. In 2018, Gao debuted with first song, "Everybody Bounce". His 2019 song, "Without You", was a viral hit in Taiwan and was nominated for Song of the Year at the 31st Golden Melody Awards. On 30 April 2019, Gao released his debut album titled #osnrap. That same year, he won the Best New Asian Artist Mandarin award at the Mnet Asian Music Awards.

Besides his solo career, in 2018, Gao formed the rap group Ching G Squad with three other rappers: Shou, Red, and ChrisFlow. The group released their first extended play, Watermelon, on September 20, 2019.

Discography

Studio albums 

 #osnrap (2019)

Awards

References 

1997 births
Living people
Taiwanese rappers
Musicians from Taipei